When No One Would Listen is a 1992 American made-for-television film, telling the story of housewife Jessica Cochran (Michele Lee), and the domestic violence she faces from her controlling, mentally unstable husband Gary Cochran (James Farentino). The film featured main actress Michele Lee as the executive producer. When No One Would Listen is set in Glen Oaks, Queens, although the case it is based upon occurred elsewhere.

Background
When No One Would Listen is loosely based on David Guenther, also known as the "Make My Day Killer" due to the shooting of his neighbours in what he claimed was self-defence against their trespassing. Guenther had been the first person to invoke the State of Colorado's "Make My Day" law, which allows residents to use deadly force in their homes against intruders. Guenther later shot and murdered his estranged wife Pamela (age 30), and severely injured her boyfriend, Stanley Stinson, who survived. The Guenthers’ two children, Christopher (age 13), and Jennifer (age 11), saw the shootings and were key prosecution witnesses along with Stinson. Names and places in When No One Would Listen were changed to protect remaining witnesses and the Guenther children.

Plot
Timid housewife Jessica Cochran (Michele Lee) has been married to her controlling husband Gary (James Farentino) for years. She began dating him at the age of fifteen and has two children, daughter Maggie (Anndi McAfee) and son Pete (Damion Stevens). Gary had hit Jessica and threatened to kill her early-on in their relationship, although he has never hit the children. Both children are aware that Gary beats their mother, but they feel powerless to stop the abuse.

After some career trouble, Gary moves the family out to the New York suburb of Glen Oaks. At first, Gary seems like a sweet and loving husband, but after getting mad at some hippie neighbours who enjoy smoking marijuana, drinking alcohol and partying, he becomes obsessed with these neighbours, constantly reporting them to the police for petty reasons. Unemployed, Gary takes out his anger on Jessica. He attempts to cover up his inability to secure a new job by buying Maggie and Pete a VCR and a VHS tape of Disney's The Little Mermaid, but then begins verbally attacking Jessica and his neighbours when Jessica asks him if he got a new job. Jessica takes up a part-time job at a bakery to help make ends meet; there she meets a new friend named Lee (Lee Garlington), who makes pottery as a hobby and shares some cigarettes with Jessica while they laugh at risque sex jokes. Lee declares that she "likes [Jessica's] buns!" (referring to Jessica's sourdough buns from the bakery), after which Jessica quips back, "well, I like your jugs!" (referring to Lee's pottery). Jessica also befriends her new boss, Walter, and becomes close with him. Meanwhile, Gary criticizes Jessica for wearing a knee-length skirt to work, telling her that she has fat legs.

Lee and Walter begin to notice bruises on Jessica's body, and urge her to divorce Gary and flee with the children. One night, during a particularly loud house party, a hippie stumbles drunk up to the Cochran home and repeatedly knocks on the door, making annoying noises. Gary responds by shooting and killing the hippie's pregnant wife, which horrifies Jessica. Gary is released from jail after claiming that the neighbours were trespassing on his private property, and arguing that the shooting was in self-defence. Meanwhile, while trying to teach Pete how to fight back against some local school bullies, he violently punches Pete in the stomach, causing the boy to collapse on the floor. Jessica catches Pete that night applying ice cubes from the kitchen freezer onto a large bruise up one side of his body. Realizing that Gary is beginning to beat the children, she sneaks out of the home and spends the night with Walter. She begins dating Walter, although Lee advises Jessica to go underground to a women's shelter because of Gary's murderous history.

Gary becomes more and more unhinged, attempting at one point to force Maggie and Pete into his car so he can abduct them. Walter and Jessica are able to pull the children away from him and rescue them. Lee takes Jessica to the police for a restraining order, but the issuing judge (Ellen Crawford) warns Jessica that a restraining order is merely a piece of paper, with no power to physically stop Gary from coming back. Gary lures Jessica back into the Cochran home and holds her hostage, forcing her to put on skimpy black lingerie while he proceeds to rape her. The next morning, a SWAT team arrives and a hostage negotiator is able to convince Gary to let Jessica free. Despite Gary's actions, he is once again kept out of jail.

Jessica moves into a women's shelter for the sake of Maggie and Pete, both of whom make friends at the shelter and begin resuming normal childhood activities, like drawing pictures. Jessica continues dating Walter, and they decide one evening to take the children to a diner for supper, in the hopes that it will be a fun activity to distract themselves from Gary. Unbeknownst to them, Gary has found the women's shelter and is following Jessica in his car. Jessica, Walter and the children eat a meal together while Gary watches from outside. Upon exiting the diner, Jessica and Walter share a kiss, infuriating Gary, who steps out of his hiding place and shoots Jessica and Walter with a revolver. An ending scene reveals that the real "Jessica Cochran" (Pamela Guenther) was mortally wounded by the gunshots and died, while the real "Walter Wheeler" (Stanley Stinson) recovered from his injuries and testified against Gary in court. It is revealed that the real "Maggie" and "Pete" Cochran (Christopher and Jennifer Guenther) were taken in by their grandparents after the killing of their mother.

Cast
Michele Lee as Jessica Cochran
James Farentino as Gary Cochran
John Spencer as Walter Wheeler
Lee Garlington as Lee
Anndi McAfee as Maggie Cochran
Damion Stevens as Pete Cochran
Ellen Crawford as Judge Beckerman
Cicely Tyson as Sarah
Vincent Dale as Young officer

Reception
When No One Would Listen received mixed reviews from critics, with Richard Huff of Variety praising the acting of John Spencer as Walter, and saying of the film itself, "Cindy Myer’s writing is at times moving and other times predictable and sappy. Yet using both Jessica and Gary to narrate during the picture adds another aspect to the project that helps to snare and build tension for the viewers." Mental health information directory Therapy Route praised the film for its accurate portrayal of domestic abuse, adding When No One Would Listen to its "Movies about domestic violence and abuse - Mental Health Related Films" list.

When No One Would Listen continues to air sporadically on the Lifetime Movie Network, and has been uploaded as a bootleg copy to YouTube by various users. The film was nominated for three different awards, including a Young Artist Award for Best Actress in a Television Movie (for Anndi McAfee in the role of Maggie Cochran).

References

External links

Lifetime (TV network) films
1992 television films
1992 films
Films set in the 1980s
Crime films based on actual events
Films about domestic violence
Films set in New York City
Films directed by Armand Mastroianni